Scars & Souvenirs is the third album by Canadian rock band Theory of a Deadman, and was released on April 1, 2008. It has so far been the band's most successful album to date and has spawned many hit singles. A special edition CD/DVD of the album was released on October 20, 2009. It features bonus and acoustic tracks (some were released on the iTunes version of the album), the band's entire video catalog, and numerous making-of and behind-the-scenes features. Bonus video includes "Haciendas," Tyler's special send-up of MTV's Cribs.

Titling
The title of the album comes from a line in the song "By the Way". The title refers to the "scars and souvenirs," or the ups and downs of one's lifetime, as a large majority of the songs on the album deal with things like relationships and obstacles that one might encounter during his or her life.

Singles
The first single from it, "So Happy" was released to radio on February 11 and can be listened to on their MySpace page while "By the Way" and "Bad Girlfriend" were released on the band's official website on March 10, 2008. "All or Nothing" was released on June 2 as a single for adult and Hot AC radio. Robin Diaz (Closure; Trapt; Daughtry), Chris Daughtry (Daughtry), and Brent Smith (Shinedown) are guests on the album. The band confirmed on May 14, 2008, that the next single to be released in the US and Canada was "Bad Girlfriend", on rock stations only. As of September 6, 2008, "Bad Girlfriend" is Theory of a Deadman's first single to reach number 1 on the Mainstream Rock Chart. In the music video of "Heaven (Little By Little)", which released for the MTV premiere in November 2008, a young tattooed woman, played by Elizabeth McCoy, had herself related to the damaged relationships with broken angel wings in the arms of her lightest dream.

Reception
The album received generally positive reviews from critics. The album debuted at Number 10 on Billboard Top Rock Albums, Number 8 on Billboard Top Modern Rock/Alternative Albums, Number 1 on Billboard Top Hard Rock albums, and Number 26 on the Billboard 200. The album has so far been more successful than the band's previous albums due to the popularity of some of its singles, including "Bad Girlfriend", "Hate My Life", "Not Meant to Be", and "All or Nothing". On March 31, 2021, Scars & Souvenirs was certified 2× Platinum by the  RIAA  with sales reaching 2,000,000 copies in the U.S. In May 2009, it was certified Platinum by the CRIA.

Track listing

iTunes, Zune and Amazon bonus tracks

Special edition bonus tracks

Special edition DVD tracks

Personnel

Theory of a Deadman
Tyler Connolly  - lead vocals, lead guitar
Dave Brenner  - rhythm guitar, backing vocals
Dean Back  - bass guitar, backing vocals
Robin Diaz  - drums, percussion, backing vocals on By the Way
Additional musicians
Brent Smith  - background vocals on So Happy
Chris Daughtry  - background vocals on By the Way
Production
Howard Benson  - producer
Mike Plotnikoff  - recording
Chris Lord-Alge  - mixing
Ted Jensen  - mastering

Charts

Weekly charts

Year-end charts

Certifications

References

2008 albums
Albums produced by Howard Benson
Theory of a Deadman albums